Henry Plimpton Kendall (January 15, 1878 – November 3, 1959) was a New England entrepreneur, industrialist, and philanthropist from Walpole, Massachusetts. He is considered one of the pioneers of scientific management.

Biography

Early life 
Kendall was born in 1878 in Charlestown, Massachusetts, son of Henry Lucien Kendall and Clara Idella (Plimpton) Kendal. After attending the Lawrenceville School, boarding schools in New Jersey, he graduated from Amherst College in Massachusetts in 1899.

After his graduation in 1899, he started his career at the Plimpton Press company in Norwood, Massachusetts, a company own by his uncle Herbert Mosley Plimpton (1859-1948). He worked his way up from a minor position to general manager and treasurer in 1910. In this period he had grown an interest in the scientific management techniques of Frederick Winslow Taylor, which he had applied in the Plimpton Press plant. This became one of the earliest successful applications of the Taylor system.

Further career and honours 

Kendall eventually acquired and founded many textile factories and other companies through his company, the Kendall Company, which emphasized product research and scientific processes. In 1972 the Kendall Company became a wholly owned subsidiary of Colgate-Palmolive.

In 1921-22 Kendall had served as 5h president of the Taylor Society as successor of Henry S. Dennison, and was succeeded by Richard A. Feiss. In 1934 and 1935 he served as Chairman of The Business Council, then known as Business Advisory Council for the United States Department of Commerce.

In the manufacturing village of Slatersville, Rhode Island the Kendall Dean School was named in his honor. Kendall also founded the Kendall Whaling Museum in Sharon, Massachusetts in 1955, which in 2001 was merged with the New Bedford Whaling Museum and now forms large portions of its permanent collection.

Personal life and death
Kendall was married to Evelyn Louise Way (1893–1979), and they had three children including Henry Way Kendall (1926-1999), who won the Nobel Prize in physics in 1990, and business executive John Plimpton Kendall.

Kendall was an active philanthropist. He founded the Kendall Foundation and served on the American Board of Commissioners for Foreign Missions, a Christian mission society. Kendall's property Moose Hill Farm is now an open space for the public.

Kendall died on November 3, 1959 in Sharon, Massachusetts.

Work 
Kendall eventually acquired and founded many textile factories and other companies through his company, the Kendall Company, which emphasized product research and scientific processes.

His company produced products such as Curity Diapers and Curad finger bandages (those brands are now owned by Covidien). He first turned around the Lewis Manufacturing Company in Walpole and then purchased the manufacturing village of Slatersville, Rhode Island. Kendall Company produced textiles for the government and Red Cross during World War I and expanded throughout the twentieth century acquiring manufacturing facilities in the United States and Mexico.

Selected publications 
 James G., Dennison H., Gay E., Kendall H. and Burrit A. (1926), Profit-Sharing and Stock Ownership for Employees, Harper, New York
 Henry B. Elkind (ed.) Preventive management: mental hygiene in industry,  with foreword by Henry P. Kendall, 1930.
 Early maps of Carolina and adjoining regions From the Collection of Henry P. Kendall, Boston, Mass. Camden, S.C. 1937
 Henry P Kendall, Special exhibition of the Henry P. Kendall whaling collection at the Pratt school of naval architecture and marine engineering, 1937.	
 Henry P. Kendall, The Kendall Company, 50 years of Yankee enterprise!, 1953.

References

External links
Henry P. Kendall Foundation
Henry P. Kendall Collection at University of South Carolina
Kendall-Plimpton Family History Collection at the Amherst College Archives & Special Collections

1878 births
1959 deaths
Engineers from Massachusetts
American industrialists
American philanthropists
American chief executives of manufacturing companies
People from Walpole, Massachusetts
Amherst College alumni